The Humboldt Range is a largely north-south running range of mountains in northwest Nevada, USA, that extend from the town of Imlay in the north to the junction with the West Humboldt Range in the south. It is bordered continuously by Interstate 80 and the Humboldt River, largely expanded in the form of the Rye Patch Reservoir in this area, on the west side and by a long and fairly broad Buena Vista Valley to the east, in a typical basin-and-range pattern. The Humboldts are ostensibly visible to travelers along Interstate 80, especially with respect to the highest point of the range, Star Peak, which with a quite nicely defined tip reaches an elevation of 9,836 feet (2,998 m), located in the center of the north range section. The midpoint of the range is in the area of Fourth of July Flat. The Humboldt Range is also noteworthy for having a famous historical town at its base on the eastern side called Unionville, which, for a brief period, was home to Samuel Clemens.  Another historical site, now a ghost town, nearby is called Star City. Unlike some ranges in the vicinity, the substantial height of the Humboldts allows for a number of continuously flowing watersheds, and hiking the terrain is a somewhat noted activity.

References

External links

Fourth of July Flat (approximate range center), lat-long.com (coordinates)
Star Peak, topoquest, (coordinates)

Mountain ranges of Nevada
Range, Humboldt
Mountain ranges of Pershing County, Nevada